Melamid is a Hebrew surname which translates to teacher in English, a variant of  Melamed; see this page for other variants.

Melamid may refer to:

Alexander Melamid (born 1945), American Russian-Jewish artist 
 (1916-1993), Soviet and Russian historian

Hebrew-language surnames
Jewish surnames